Prathai is a district (amphoe) in the northeastern part of Nakhon Ratchasima province, northeastern Thailand.

History
Prathai village was settled in the Khmer era. King Jayavarman II set his camp in the area when he expanded his power to the west. After his reign, Prathai was deserted. It became a community again in the Sukhothai era.

Prathai in Khmer means 'camp'.

Tambon Prathai was separated from Bua Yai district to create a minor district (king amphoe) on 1 January 1961 and upgraded to a full district in 1963.

Geography
Neighboring districts are (from the north clockwise): Phon and Nong Song Hong of Khon Kaen province; Ban Mai Chaiyaphot of Buriram province; and Mueang Yang, Chum Phuang, Phimai, Non Daeng, Sida, and Bua Lai of Nakhon Ratchasima Province.

Administration

Central administration 
Prathai is divided into 13 sub-districts (tambons), which are further subdivided into 151 administrative villages (mubans).

Missing numbers are tambons which now form Non Daeng District.

Local administration 
There is one sub-district municipality (thesaban tambon) in the district:
 Prathai consisting of parts of sub-district Prathai.

There are 13 sub-district administrative organizations (SAO) in the district:
 Prathai consisting of parts of sub-district Prathai.
 Krathum Rai consisting of sub-district Krathum Rai.
 Wang Mai Daeng consisting of sub-district Wang Mai Daeng.
 Talat Sai consisting of sub-district Talat Sai.
 Nong Phluang consisting of sub-district Nong Phluang.
 Nong Khai consisting of sub-district Nong Khai.
 Han Huai Sai consisting of sub-district Han Huai Sai.
 Don Man consisting of sub-district Don Man.
 Nang Ram consisting of sub-district Nang Ram.
 Non Phet consisting of sub-district Non Phet.
 Thung Sawang consisting of sub-district Thung Sawang.
 Khok Klang consisting of sub-district Khok Klang.
 Mueang Don consisting of sub-district Mueang Don.

References

External links
amphoe.com (Thai)

Prathai